Varso or Varso Place is a neomodern office building complex in Warsaw, Poland. It was designed by Foster + Partners and developed by HB Reavis. The complex features three buildings. It was topped out on 20 February 2021 and completed in September 2022, with the opening of the observation deck planned for the first half of 2023.

Design 
Varso Place is located in Wola, on the corner of Chmielna Street and John Paul II Avenue (pl). Initially, the project was named Chmielna Business Center, being later changed to Varso, which references the Latin name for Warsaw—Varsovia.

British-based architecture studio Foster + Partners designed the main tower and HRA Architekci was responsible for designing the Varso 1 and Varso 2 buildings.

A restaurant and a bar called Skytop Restaurant & Bar will occupy the 46th and 48th floors. All three buildings will be connected to each other on the ground floor level and the entire complex will be connected to the Warsaw Central station. A four-storey underground car park will accommodate approximately 1,100 cars, 80 motorbikes and 750 bicycles. The modernisation of the surroundings around Chmielna Street is a part of the investment and it will include new pavements, street lamps, benches, bike stands and signage, as well as planting shrubs and trees.

Construction 

The general contractor is HB Reavis Construction, a company from the HB Reavis Group. The building permit for Varso was obtained in December 2016, with construction work commencing the same month.

In early 2017, the construction team had to move a transformer that was powering the Warsaw Central Station, as it was located exactly where the Varso Tower would be built. It was pulled out using a specialized crane and then transported to Mokotów Field, where it stood next to the National Library. In the future, it will be moved back and displayed next to the entrance of Varso Tower.

On 20 February 2021, the final piece of the spire was lifted to the top of Varso Tower, bringing the skyscraper to its full height of 310 metres (1,017 ft). The tower was completed in September 2022.

Gallery

See also
List of tallest buildings in Poland
List of tallest buildings in the European Union
List of tallest buildings in Europe

References

External links

 

Skyscraper office buildings in Warsaw
Foster and Partners buildings